The International Confederation for Disarmament and Peace was an organisation formed by peace groups from western and non-aligned nations in 1963.

As a result of confrontation between western and Soviet delegates at the 1962 World Congress for Peace and Disarmament, which was organised by the USSR-backed World Peace Council, non-aligned peace organisations decided to form an international body that would be independent of the World Peace Council.  The founding conference of this body was attended by delegates from forty organizations.

The founding organizations were:
 
Accra Assembly Continuing Committee
Aktionsgruppen Mot Svensk Atoombomb
American Friends Service Committee
Arbeitsgemeinschaft Deutscher Friendensverbande
Campaign for Nuclear Disarmament (UK)
Canadian Campaign for Nuclear Disarmament
Colleges and Universities CND (UK)
Combined CND Groups and New South Wales and Queensland Peace Committee
Combined Universities Campaign (Canada)
Comite 1962 voor de Vrede
Committee of 100 (United Kingdom)
Committee on Non-Violent Action
Consulta della Pace
European Federation Against Nuclear Arms
Fellowship of Reconciliation and War Resisters (Belgium)
Friends Peace Committee (UK)
Gandhi Peace Foundation
Greek Peace Committee
International Fellowship of Reconciliation
International Liaison Committee of Organizations for Peace
Irish CND
Kampagnen mod Atomvaben
Kampanjen mot Atomvapen
Komiteen for Oplysning om Atomfaren
National Committee for a Sane Nuclear Policy
National Peace Council (UK)
New Zealand CND
P.S.U  (France)
Peace Pledge Union
Schweizerische Bewegung Gegen Die Altomare Anfrustung
Society for Social Responsibility in Science
Student Peace Union
Turn Towards Peace
Voice of Women (Canada)
War Resisters International
War Resisters League
Women’s International League for Peace and Freedom
Women Strike for Peace
Yugoslav League for Peace Independence and Equality of Peoples.

It was merged with the International Peace Bureau in 1978.

References

External links
Catalogue of the ICDP archives, held at the Modern Records Centre, University of Warwick

Peace organizations
Organizations established in 1963
Organizations disestablished in 1978